Custer's Revenge (also known as Mystique Presents Swedish Erotica: Custer's Revenge) is an adult action game published by American Multiple Industries for the Atari 2600, first released in November 1982. The game gained notoriety owing to its goal of raping a Native American woman.

The titular player character is based on Lieutenant Colonel and Brevet Major General George Armstrong Custer, a famous American cavalry commander who is most well known for his major defeat and death at the Battle of Little Bighorn.

Following the Christmas season of 1982, the rights to American Multiple Industries' games, including Custer's Revenge, were sold off to the adult video game company PlayAround. Under PlayAround's parent company, Castlespring Enterprises, Custer's Revenge was re-branded as Westward Ho for the European market and given slight modifications to its original gameplay. These alterations included simple aesthetic changes such as the darkening in color of the Native American woman's skin tone. PlayAround also made a gender-reversed version of Custer's Revenge named General Retreat. The game was universally panned by critics and has been described as one of the worst video games ever made.

Gameplay 

Custer's Revenge is an action video game in which the player controls General Custer, who must advance through the playing field and avoid arrows in order to rape the Indian maiden Revenge, who is tied to a pole on the other side. The game consists of four numbered modes of play; modes 1 and 3 are single-player campaigns, while modes 2 and 4 are hotseat multiplayer modes. In modes 1 and 2, the player(s) must only avoid arrows, while in modes 3 and 4, cacti that appear and disappear at random intervals are added as obstacles. Custer can move left or right if the joystick is moved in those directions, while shifting the joystick up or down will cause Custer to stop.

Custer begins the game with three lives, which are represented by small cacti on a black stripe at the bottom of the screen. If an arrow touches Custer's hat or if Custer comes into contact with a cactus, he loses a life to the tune of "Taps". It is possible for Custer to stand in between two arrows and not get hit. If Custer successfully reaches Revenge, the player must repeatedly press the fire button for Custer to penetrate her, which occurs to the "Charge" fanfare. Each penetration awards one point, and the player earns an extra life for every 50 points. The player(s) can accumulate no more than six lives at any given time. For every 50 points scored, Custer returns to his original position on the field, and the speed of the arrows increases. The arrow speed can also be increased by flipping the difficulty switch on the Atari console.

Controversy 
Custer's Revenge quickly gained notoriety upon its release. Sold in a sealed package labeled "NOT FOR SALE TO MINORS" and selling for $49.95, it acknowledged that children might nonetheless see the game.  The game's literature stated "if the kids catch you and should ask, tell them Custer and the maiden are just dancing." The makers elected to preview the game for women's and Native American groups, an act that many thought was a publicity stunt. Women's rights groups criticized the game, stating that it was a simulation of rape; the back of the packaging states "she's not about to take it lying down, by George! Help is on the way. By God! He's coming." Other groups such as Women Against Pornography, Native American spokespersons, and critics of the adult video game industry in general protested about the content of the game. Activists pressured legislators to outlaw the game, with Suffolk County voting to ban all "X-rated" games within their jurisdiction, and Los Angeles County voting 3-1 to ban Custer's Revenge alongside American Multiple Industries' other adult-only games Bachelor Party and Beat 'Em & Eat 'Em. Multiple Industries subsequently pursued an $11 million lawsuit against Suffolk County and legislator Philip Nolan "because of a resolution authorizing the county executive to take action to halt sales and distribution" of the game. Oklahoma City, home to a large Native American population, also unanimously passed a resolution condemning the game as "distasteful" and "not in the best interests of the community". While both Ward 1 Councilman Bob McCoy and city attorney Walter Powell sought to block distribution within the city, and Multiple Industries did briefly halt distribution there, it was never officially banned by the city as is sometimes erroneously reported.

Nevertheless, the focused media attention generated publicity for the game and its Streisand effect caused it to sell approximately 80,000 copies, twice as many copies as Bachelor Party and Beat 'Em & Eat 'Em. Atari received numerous complaints about the game however and responded by trying to sue the game's makers. Stuart Kesten, President of American Multiple Industries, stated "our object is not to arouse, our object is to entertain [...] When people play our games, we want them smiling, we want them laughing." The game's designer, Joel Miller, said Custer was "seducing" the maiden and that she was a "willing participant". By April 1983, the game was withdrawn from circulation.

Reception
In 1988, computer gaming magazine Ahoy! called Custer's Revenge "an [affront] to common decency", in contrast to more modern and 'tasteful' adult games. Electronic Gaming Monthlys Seanbaby placed it as number 9 in his "20 worst games of all time" feature.

In 2008, the University of Calgary professor Tom Keenan cited "the hideous Custer's Revenge game", 26 years after its release, in an op-ed piece about current video game violence issues for the Calgary Herald. That same year, the game was credited by Australian PC Magazine as being one of the worst games ever made, while Games.net ranked Custer's victim as fifth on the list of top ten "disturbingly sexual" game characters. In 2010, Custer placed eighth on machinima.com's list of the top perverts in gaming. UGO.com ranked it as tenth on the list of the most racist video games in history in 2010, also ranking the game's General Custer as the second most unsexy video game character of all time in 2012.

See also 

 Cultural depictions of George Armstrong Custer
 RapeLay
 X-Man
 List of video games notable for negative reception

References

Citations

Bibliography

External links 
Custer's Revenge at AtariAge
Custer's Revenge at Atari Mania

1982 video games
Action video games
Atari 2600 games
Atari 2600-only games
Cultural depictions of George Armstrong Custer
Erotic Atari 2600 games
Multiplayer and single-player video games
Multiplayer hotseat games
Mystique (company) games
Native American-related controversies
North America-exclusive video games
Obscenity controversies in video games
Race-related controversies in video games
Rape in fiction
Video games developed in the United States
Video games set in the United States
Western (genre) video games